The Benning / Dorothy I. Height Neighborhood Library is a branch of the District of Columbia Public Library system, located in Benning, a neighborhood in Northeast Washington, D.C.

History 

The site at 3935 Benning Road NE was previously home to a library designed by Clark T. Harmon as part of a D.C. Public Works Program initiative, a one-story brick-and-concrete building that opened in 1962. The library had played an important role in the surrounding community since its inception.

In 2004, the original library was closed to make way for a new structure on the same site, as part of a citywide push to revamp D.C.'s public libraries. An interim library served the Benning community while construction was underway.

The new Benning / Dorothy I. Height branch of the DCPL opened on April 5, 2010.

It was named in honor of Dorothy Height, an influential civil rights and women's rights activist.

The new library was designed by the architecture firm Davis Brody Bond Aedas. Construction of the two-story, 22,000-square-foot building cost $12 million.

The library features public art from artists based in D.C.'s Ward 7.

See also 

 District of Columbia Public Library
 Benning (Washington, D.C.)

References 

Library buildings completed in 2010
Public libraries in Washington, D.C.
2010 establishments in Washington, D.C.